The 1999 Jiffy Lube 300 was a NASCAR Winston Cup Series race that took place on July 11, 1999, at the New Hampshire International Speedway in Loudon, New Hampshire. This race was the 18th stop of the 1999 NASCAR Winston Cup Series tour.

Background 
The New Hampshire International Speedway is a 1.058-mile flat oval built in 1989 on the remnants of Bryar Motorsports Park in Loudon, New Hampshire.  The track features 12 degree banking in the corners and 2 degrees on the straights.  The straights are 1,500 feet long.

Entry list

Qualifying 
Jeff Gordon set a new track record at 131.171 mph in qualifying.  Dale Earnhardt, Jr. made his second Winston Cup Series start in this race.  

Failed to qualify:  Robert Pressley (#77), Derrike Cope (#30), David Green (#41), Dave Marcis (#71)

Race recap 
The race went green with Jeff Gordon on the pole and led the first 19 laps.  Dale Earnhardt, Jr.'s second Cup race ended very early as ignition problems sidelined him to 43rd place.  The race featured 7 caution flags for 49 laps.

The final 91 laps finished under green.  This set up a long fuel-mileage run to the finish.  Some drivers were able to stretch their fuel while others could not.  Tony Stewart was on his way to win his first ever Winston Cup race, leading a total of 118 laps.  However, with 3 laps to go, he ran out of fuel on the backstretch.  He fell back to 10th and would have to wait another day to win his first Cup race.  Jeff Burton, who started 38th, led the final 3 laps to win the race.  Kenny Wallace finished a career-best 2nd.  Bill Elliott finished 5th, his only top 5 in what would be a dismal 1999 campaign for Elliott.

On the last lap, Jeff Gordon used a bump-and-run on Dale Jarrett, taking the fourth spot.  After the race, Jarrett was very upset at Gordon and led to a verbal confrontation in the garage.

Race results

Timeline 

 Start:  Jeff Gordon leads the first 19 laps from the pole.
 Lap 45:  Dale Earnhardt, Jr. goes behind the wall with ignition problems.
 Lap 79:  Joe Nemechek crashes in the frontstretch, bringing out the first caution of the day.
 Lap 99:  Jerry Nadeau spins in turns 1 and 2, bringing out the second caution.
 Lap 115:  Mark Martin, Kenny Irwin, and Steve Park got into an accident on the backstretch, bringing out the third caution.
 Lap 122:  Ken Schrader, Johnny Benson, and Geoffrey Bodine crashed in the backstretch, bringing out the fourth caution.  Much oil was dropped on the racetrack which extended the caution for 14 laps.
 Lap 136:  John Andretti took the lead for the first time and would lead for 60 laps.
 Lap 141:  Jeff Gordon made contact with Rusty Wallace, sending the Miller Lite/Harley-Davidson Ford into the turn 3 wall, bringing out the fifth caution.
 Lap 195:  Dave Blaney crashes in turn 4, bringing out the sixth caution.
 Lap 204:  Bobby Labonte, one of the leaders for most of the race, got loose underneath the lapped car of Chad Little, spun out and hit the wall.  Dale Earnhardt, who was running fifth, also spun out trying to avoid Labonte.  This would be the seventh and final caution of the race.
 Lap 297  Tony Stewart ran out of the fuel with 3 laps to go.  Jeff Burton would go by Stewart to take the lead.
 Lap 300:  Jeff Burton takes the checkered flag.

Post-race championship standings

References 

1999 NASCAR Winston Cup Series
NASCAR races at New Hampshire Motor Speedway